The Worm  is a dance motion associated with breakdancing and "funk" subculture, also referred to as  the centipede, the caterpillar or the dolphin, or also erroneously the snake or the wave (names of other breakdance moves). In this move a subject lies prone position and forms a rippling motion through their body, creating a wave reminiscent of earthworm locomotion. This can be done either forward or backwards, by shifting weight from the upper body to the lower body (backwards) or vice versa for forwards. The motion begins by pushing off from the ground with one's hands to start a ripple.

The worm was performed at shows in the 1970s and was popularized widely during the 1980s "funk" period, and continues to be associated with breakdancing.

The move has been used and popularized by WWE wrestler Scotty 2 Hotty as his finishing maneuver ending with a chop drop, and would later be used by Otis Dozovic as his signature maneuver called the "Caterpillar" ending with a standing elbow drop. David Arquette, as a wrestler, has used the worm dance either ending with a chop drop as a finisher in WCW along with a standing elbow drop later on in the independent circuit.

References

Breakdance moves
Funk dance